Qiu Fengze (born 31 October 1988), born Kenny Khoo, is a Singaporean singer-songwriter based in Taiwan. Khoo gained popularity after appearing in a role-playing game on the Taiwanese variety show 100% Entertainment in 2019.

Career

Pre-debut 
In 2012, Khoo auditioned and became one of the 12 participants in the singing competition Guinness Live! which was conducted in front of live audiences in various clubs. His performances caught the attention of director Chai Yee Wei which led him to be cast as one of the 4 lead roles in the Singapore music movie That Girl in Pinafore in 2013.

He later studied songwriting at Funkie Monkies music school under Singaporean music veterans Eric Ng and Xiaohan.

Official debut and after 
In 2014, Khoo released his debut album Ten Storeys which shot to the No. 1 spot on Taiwan's G-Music sales charts a month after its release in April. He released his second album Is Anyone Out There in 2016.

In 2017, he was cast in television drama Rock Soulmate and released a single titled Signal with fellow castmate and singer Wayne Huang.

In 2018, he set up his own company Reason Brothers with Singaporean music producer Cheong Waii Hoong to produce his own music.

In 2019, Khoo shot to fame after participating in the Werewolf role-playing game on Taiwanese variety show 100% Entertainment. He released his third album Prophet on his 31st birthday in October.

In March 2020, Khoo joined 100% Entertainment as a fixed host. He released Modern Love as part of W0LF四坚情 in April 2020.

In July 2020, W0LF四坚情 expanded to include another fellow game participant and rapper . They became known as W0LF(S)五坚情 and released their first single as five, All Day, the same month.

In October 2020, W0LF(S)五坚情 released their second single 反正我好看 in collaboration with Samsung for the Samsung Galaxy S20 FE 5G.

In In August 2022, Khoo left 100% Entertainment, citing health reasons.

Discography

Albums 
 Ten Storeys (Apr 2014)
 Is Anyone Out There (Oct 2016)
 Prophet (Oct 2019)
 Eclipse (Jan 2021)

Singles 
 Signal (with Wayne Huang) (Nov 2017)
Werewolves (May 2019)
 Daylight (Aug 2019)
Lover (Feb 2020)
Guardian Angel (Sep 2020) 
 For Your Happiness (May 2022)

Filmography

Television series 
 皇恩浩蕩 (2016)
 搖滾畢業生(2018)

Movies 
That Girl in Pinafore (2013)
Love Shake (2014)

References 

1988 births
Living people
21st-century Singaporean male singers
Singaporean composers
Singaporean people of Chinese descent
Singaporean singer-songwriters